Barcheek pipefish, Syngnathus exilis, is a species of the pipefishes. Widespread in the Eastern Pacific from the Half Moon Bay in central California, United States, to south central Baja California and Guadalupe Island, Mexico. Marine subtropical demersal fish, up to 25 cm length.

References

Syngnathus
Fish of North America
Fish of the Pacific Ocean
Western North American coastal fauna
Fish described in 1916